The Tyler Mowry House is an historic house in North Smithfield, Rhode Island.  It is a -story wood-frame structure, five bays wide, with a gable roof and two interior chimneys.  The entry is centered on the main (south-facing) facade, with sidelight windows and pilasters supporting a complex entablature and cornice.  A -story ell extends to the east.  The interior of the house has retained much of the original Federal-period woodwork, plasterwork, doors, and hardware.  The house is distinctive as a remarkably unaltered house from the early 19th century, lacking modernizing alterations such as electricity and plumbing.

The house was listed on the National Register of Historic Places in 1996.

See also
National Register of Historic Places listings in Providence County, Rhode Island

References

Houses on the National Register of Historic Places in Rhode Island
Houses completed in 1825
Houses in Providence County, Rhode Island
North Smithfield, Rhode Island
National Register of Historic Places in Providence County, Rhode Island